Zăvoi (until 1950 Zăvoiu) is a commune in Caraș-Severin County, western Romania with a population of 3,946 people. It is composed of seven villages: 23 August, Măgura (until 1960 Crâjma; Korcsoma), Măru (Almafa), Poiana Mărului (Almafatelep), Valea Bistrei (Bisztranagyvölgy), Voislova (Szörénybalázsd), and Zăvoi. 

The river Rusca discharges into the Bistra in Voislova village, while the river Bistra Mărului flows through Poiana Mărului and Măru villages.

Zăvoi is located in the northeastern part of the county, on the border with Gorj and Hunedoara counties.

The commune borders Rusca Montană commune to the north, the town of Oțelu Roșu and Obreja commune to the northwest, Turnu Ruieni commune to the west, Bolvașnița commune to the southwest, Teregova commune and Gorj County to the south, Hunedoara County to the southeast, Băuțar commune to the east, and Marga commune to the northeast.

Zăvoi is traversed west to east by national road , which connects Caransebeș to the town of Hațeg in Hunedoara County; the portion of the road that runs through the commune was upgraded in October 2020.

The Castra of Zăvoi is a Roman fort located on the territory of the commune.

References

Communes in Caraș-Severin County
Localities in Romanian Banat